Shivajinagar (also known as Bhambwade, Bhamburde) is an inner suburb of the city of  Pune, India.

History

The area has a very long history with the 8th-century Rashtrakuta-era cave temple of Pataleshwar being the oldest manmade structure in Pune.

Shivajinagar was earlier a village known as Bhambwade, with the name changing over time to Bhamburde.
During the Peshwa era, a handmade paper factory operated in Bhamburde. It is believed that Chhatrapati Shivaji Maharaj visited the Rokdoba temple in the village and stayed at the Shirole family home, Shirole Wada.

During the Maratha and British eras, the village Patil (head/chief) came from the Shiledar Shirole (Patil) family, members of which also served as Shiledar (warriors) in the Maratha army. The Shirole family is now a well-known political family.

In the 19th century, Jangali Maharaj, a saint revered mostly by Hindus, established his residence in Bhamburde. A temple with his tomb (samadhi) is located today in Shivajinagar and a major road is named after him.

In 1884, the Inamdar of Bhamburde, Rajaram Naroji Shirole Patil, leased 37 acres of land at the foot of Hanuman hill for 99 years to the Deccan Education Society. The society's best-known institution, Fergusson College, was built on this land.

After independence, Bhamburde was renamed Shivajinagar.
In the early 20th century, Wadarvadi, one of the oldest slums in Pune, came up on unused land belonging to the Shirole and Bahirat Patil families close to the Chaturshrungi Temple.Wadarvadi is occupied mainly by the nomadic Wadar community.

In 1928, a statue of Chhatrapati Shivaji Maharaj was inaugurated on land donated by the Shirole family. The Shri Shivaji military preparatory school was later established nearby.

Geography

Shivajinagar is situated on the West bank of the Mutha river with the older parts of Pune on the east side of the river. The area is surrounded on its Western side by the Vetal and Hanuman Hills. The village deity (Gramdaivat) is the temple of Rokdoba (God Hanuman)  in Shivajinagar Gaothan. The Gaothan also has a temple of God Shri Ram.

Transport

The Mumbai – Pune old national highway begins from Shivajinagar which links Pune to Mumbai.
MSRTC lt operates a bus station that connects Pune to almost all cities in Maharashtra as well in neighboring states. Shivajinagar is well connected to other parts of the city by local PMPML buses.
Shivajinagar has Shivajinagar railway station. Pune to Lonavla suburban trains and few long-distance trains make a stop here at Shivajinagar and  Pune railway stations.

Institutions
The area is home to many central, state and local government offices. 
These include 
Pune District Court  
Pune Municipal Corporation 
India Meteorological Department - Pune regional office. Popularly known as Shimla office.
All India Radio - Akashwani Bhavan, Pune
 Cognizant Company 
 ICC Tower.
Bank Of India Zonal Office, Pune

Educational institutions
The area has a number of renowned educational institutions with a long history such as Fergusson college, Modern College of Arts, Commerce and Science Shivajinagar, College of engineering and agricultural college.

Universities and colleges

Indian Law Society's Law College
Savitribai Phule Pune University- erstwhile "University of Pune"
Marathwada Mitra Mandal College of Commerce 
Fergusson College
Brihan Maharashtra College of Commerce 
Symbiosis College 
Modern College
Hotel Management College 
College of Engineering 
Agricultural College
GIPE - abbreviated for Gokhale Institute of Politics And Economics

Schools
Modern School (Pune)|Modern School 
Bharatiya Vidya Bhavan 
Vidya Bhavan High School and Junior College 
Symbiosis International School
Shri Shivaji Preparatory Military School (Pune).

Places of interest
Shivajinagar has many places dedicated to culture, religion, sports, shopping, eating out, and recreation. The area is popular for its many eateries, and cafes, especially with younger generation.

Places of worship

Ajitnath Jain Temple
Pataleshwar Caves
Rokdoba Temple
Shri Ram Temple
Jangli Maharaj Tomb (Samadhi) Temple
Chaturshrungi Temple
Vetal Temple

Museums, parks, sports, and theater

Mahatma Phule Museum of Industry.
Bal Gandharva Ranga Mandir - The premier theatre in Pune for staging Marathi drama.
Deccan Gymkhana - Oldest Sports Club and Housing Society in the area.
Chhatrapati Sambhaji Udyan - A Park along the Mutha river bank.
Vetal Hill and Hanuman Hill - Protected nature reserves on hills.
City Pride Mangala Cinema Theatre.
City Pride Theatre and Mall.
Rahul 70 mm Cinema Theatre
E-Square Theatre and Mall.

Shopping
The Pavilion Mall.
Pune Central Mall.

Food
Bhooj Adda, Best restaurant in town

See also
Pune Suburban Railway
Bhooj Adda

References

External links
Shivajinagar bus stand Time Table
Shivajinagar, Pune
Shivajinagar Railway Station

Neighbourhoods in Pune
Monuments and memorials to Shivaji
Jyotirao Phule